Ra'fat Ali Jabr (born 20 May 1975) is a Jordanian retired footballer of Palestinian origin. He is the current assistant manager of Al-Wehdat. He was nicknamed The Artist and Picasso due to his skillful plays, mainly assists and goal scoring.

Coming through the youth system, Ra'fat Ali debuted for the senior side of Al-Wehdat on 1993 where he was able to attract admiration from the fans quickly, despite the fact that the team was filled with big stars, through time Rafat establishing himself as one of the best players in Jordan.

In 2011, Ra'fat Ali joined Kuwait for 160 Thousand Dollars as a loan.

In 2014, Ra'fat Ali announced his retirement.

Participation in international tournaments

In Pan Arab Games
1997 Pan Arab Games 
1999 Pan Arab Games

In Arab Nations Cup
1998 Arab Nations Cup 
2002 Arab Nations Cup

In WAFF Championships
2000 WAFF Championship  
2002 WAFF Championship 
2007 WAFF Championship

International goals

Retirement
Ra'fat retired after winning the Jordan League and Jordan FA Cup in 2014.

References

External links
 
 kooora.com
 

Living people
Jordanian footballers
Jordan international footballers
1975 births
Jordanian Pro League players
Kuwait Premier League players
Al-Wehdat SC players
Kuwait SC players
Jordanian expatriate footballers
Jordanian expatriate sportspeople in Kuwait
Expatriate footballers in Kuwait
Jordanian people of Palestinian descent
Sportspeople from Amman
Association football midfielders